Heliothis lucilinea is a species of moth of the family Noctuidae. It is found on Hispaniola and Jamaica.

External links
Moths of Jamaica

Heliothis
Moths described in 1858